USS Darter (SS-576), a unique submarine based on the , but incorporating many improvements, was the second ship of the United States Navy to be named for the darter, a type of small American fresh-water fish.

The contract to build Darter was awarded to the Electric Boat Division of General Dynamics Corporation in Groton, Connecticut on 30 June 1954 and her keel was laid down on 10 November 1954. She was launched on 28 May 1956 sponsored by Mrs. G.L. Russell, and commissioned on 20 October 1956.

Darter was used to experiment with numerous innovations including a three-man helmsman-planesman station using aircraft-style stick controls.

Service history

Upon commissioning Darter operated on various training exercises in the Atlantic, both locally from her homeport of Newport, Rhode Island, and on cruises to the West Indies, to Canada and Europe on NATO operations. Following an overhaul at Portsmouth Naval Shipyard she changed homeport to Charleston, South Carolina on 1 August 1959 and began training missions in support of the newly commissioned fleet ballistic missile submarines, providing anti-submarine warfare (ASW) services for surface units in the West Indies and off Key West, Florida, and serving as a platform for various Chief of Naval Operations (CNO) projects. In between these operations, Darter deployed to the Mediterranean for cruises in 1963 and 1967. She also received a major modernization overhaul at Charleston Naval Shipyard in 1965, receiving a  hull extension (the "plug", just forward of the engine room), new engines, new safety gear (SUBSAFE), better electronic gear (including the AN/BQG-4 Passive Underwater Fire Control Feasibility System (PUFFS) passive sonar with three shark-fin domes added topside) and other upgrades.

Shifting homeports again in 1971, she moved to San Diego, California, Darter made four Western Pacific (WestPac) deployments in support of 7th Fleet operations. While on one of these in 1978, the head valve failed to close while snorkeling, and the ship had to emergency surface among U.S. surface units participating in an ASW exercise. On 8 May 1979, Darter changed homeport again to Sasebo, Japan, where she operated as a forward-deployed submarine. She spent a decade there: conducting numerous joint operations with the Japanese, South Korean, Thai, Malaysian, British and Australian navies; special operations; and other operations and exercises throughout the Western Pacific. Darter served as a submarine platform for U.S. Navy SEALS, USMC Recon Marines and the U.S. Army Special Forces. She won a Battle Efficiency Award (Battle "E") in 1980 and again in 1982.

In mid-1982 she underwent an overhaul at the U.S. Naval Base Subic Bay. In September 1985, Darter was submerged when the submarine collided with the merchant ship (tanker) Kansas Getty and its anchor chain near Pusan, Korea. Darter suffered some damage and was repaired at Sasebo, Japan. Nobody was injured in the accident and the tanker was undamaged.

Darter was decommissioned in Pearl Harbor on 1 December 1989 after serving over 33 years in the US Navy. Her career was one of the longest for a US Navy submarine, during which Darter earned seven Battle “E” Awards and numerous departmental excellence awards.

She was struck from the Naval Vessel Register on 17 January 1990.

Call sign

Notes

References
 
 History of the USS Darter (SS 576)

External links

 

 

Submarines of the United States Navy
Cold War submarines of the United States
United States submarine accidents
Maritime incidents in 1978
Maritime incidents in 1985
Ships built in Groton, Connecticut
1956 ships
Ships sunk as targets
Maritime incidents in 1992
Shipwrecks of Hawaii